Microsoft Intune (formerly Windows Intune) is a Microsoft cloud-based unified endpoint management service for both corporate and BYOD devices. It extends some of the "on-premises" functionality of Microsoft Endpoint Configuration Manager to the Microsoft Azure cloud.

Distribution 
No on-premises infrastructure is required for clients to use Intune, and management is accomplished using a web-based portal. Distribution is through a subscription system in which a fixed monthly cost is incurred per user. It is also to use Endpoint Manager in co management with Microsoft Endpoint Configuration Manager.

It is included in Microsoft Enterprise Mobility + Security (EMS) suite and Microsoft Office 365 Enterprise E5, which were both succeeded by Microsoft 365 in July 2017. Microsoft 365 Business Premium licenses also include Intune and EMS.

Function 
Intune supports Android, iOS, MacOS and Windows Operating Systems. Administration is done via a web browser. The administration console allows Intune to invoke remote tasks such as malware scans.  Since version 2.0, installation of software packages in .exe, .msi and .msp format are supported. Installations are encrypted and compressed on Microsoft Azure Storage. Software installation can begin upon login. It can record and administer volume, retail and OEM licenses, and licenses which are administered by third parties. Upgrades to newer versions of the Intune software are also controlled.

Information about inventory is recorded automatically. Managed computers can be grouped together when problems occur. Intune notifies support staff as well as notifying an external dealer via e-mail.

Reception 
Der Standard praised the application, saying "the cloud service Intune promises to be a simple PC Management tool via Web console. The interface provides a quick overview of the system of state enterprise." German PC World positively evaluated "usability" saying that it "kept the interface simple." Business Computing World criticized the program, saying "Although Windows Intune worked well in our tests and did everything expected of it, we didn't find it all that easy to get to grips with", blaming the unintuitive "deceptively simple" management interface. ITespresso rated it "good", adding some criticisms.

History
Microsoft Intune was originally introduced as Windows Intune in April 2010. Microsoft announced plans to extend the service to other platforms and rename it to Microsoft Intune on 8 October 2014.

Sources

External links 
 

Microsoft cloud services
Mobile device management software
System administration
Software distribution
Network management